Hageland Aviation Services (Defunct) was a regional FAR Part 135 airline based in Anchorage, Alaska, United States.  It operated as the Ravn Connect component of Ravn Alaska, serving many destinations throughout Alaska.

History
The airline was established in 1981 in Mountain Village, Alaska.

Frontier Alaska and Hageland combined in 2008 to form the parent company HoTH and rebrand their new services as "Frontier Alaska." The following year, with the acquisition of Era, Frontier Alaska was rebranded as Era Alaska. Operations ceased with the collapse and bankruptcy of Ravn Alaska.

Fleet

 7 Beechcraft 1900
 7 Piper PA-31
 19 Cessna 207
 22 Cessna Caravan 208B

Destinations
Hageland Aviation Services operated scheduled service to the following destinations in Alaska:

 Akiachak (KKI) - Akiachak Airport
 Akiak (AKI) - Akiak Airport
 Alakanuk (AUK) - Alakanuk Airport
 Ambler (ABL) - Ambler Airport
 Anchorage (ANC) - Ted Stevens Anchorage International Airport (Hub)
 Aniak (ANI) - Aniak Airport (Hub)
 Anvik (ANV) - Anvik Airport
 Atmautluak (ATT) - Atmautluak Airport
 Atqasuk (ATK) - Atqasuk Edward Burnell Sr. Memorial Airport
 Barter Island / Kaktovik (BTI) - Barter Island LRRS Airport
 Bethel (BET) - Bethel Airport (Hub)
 Brevig Mission (KTS) - Brevig Mission Airport
 Buckland (BKC) - Buckland Airport
 Chefornak (CYF) - Chefornak Airport
 Chevak (VAK) - Chevak Airport
 Chuathbaluk (CHU) - Chuathbaluk Airport
 Crooked Creek (CKD) - Crooked Creek Airport
 Deadhorse (SCC) - Deadhorse Airport
 Deering (DRG) - Deering Airport
 Eek (EEK) - Eek Airport
 Elim (ELI) - Elim Airport
 Emmonak (EMK) - Emmonak Airport (Hub)
 Gambell (GAM) - Gambell Airport
 Golovin (GLV) - Golovin Airport
 Grayling (KGX) - Grayling Airport
 Holy Cross (HCR) - Holy Cross Airport
 Hooper Bay (HPB) - Hooper Bay Airport
 Kalskag (KLG) - Kalskag Airport
 Kasigluk (KUK) - Kasigluk Airport
 Kiana (IAN) - Bob Baker Memorial Airport
 Kipnuk (KPN) - Kipnuk Airport
 Kivalina (KVL) - Kivalina Airport
 Kobuk (OBU) - Kobuk Airport
 Kongiganak (KKH) - Kongiganak Airport
 Kotlik (KOT) - Kotlik Airport
 Kotzebue (OTZ) - Ralph Wien Memorial Airport (Hub)
 Koyuk (KKA) - Koyuk Alfred Adams Airport
 Kwethluk (KWT) - Kwethluk Airport
 Kwigillingok (KWK) - Kwigillingok Airport
 Marshall (MLL) - Marshall Don Hunter Sr. Airport
 Mekoryuk (MYU) - Mekoryuk Airport
 Mountain Village (MOU) - Mountain Village Airport
 Newtok (WWT) - Newtok Airport
 Nightmute (NME) - Nightmute Airport
 Noatak (WTK) - Noatak Airport
 Nome (OME) - Nome Airport (Hub)
 Noorvik (ORV) - Robert (Bob) Curtis Memorial Airport
 Nuiqsut (NUI) - Nuiqsut Airport
 Nunam Iqua / Sheldon Point (SXP) - Sheldon Point Airport
 Nunapitchuk (NUP) - Nunapitchuk Airport
 Pilot Station (PQS) - Pilot Station Airport
 Point Lay (PIZ) - Point Lay LRRS Airport
 Port Clarence (KPC) - Port Clarence Coast Guard Station
 Quinhagak (KWN) - Quinhagak Airport
 Red Devil (RDV) - Red Devil Airport
 Russian Mission (RSH) - Russian Mission Airport
 Savoonga (SVA) - Savoonga Airport
 Scammon Bay (SCM) - Scammon Bay Airport
 Selawik (WLK) - Selawik Airport
 Shageluk (SHX) - Shageluk Airport
 Shaktoolik (SKK) - Shaktoolik Airport
 Shishmaref (SHH) - Shishmaref Airport
 Shungnak (SHG) - Shungnak Airport
 Sleetmute (SLQ) - Sleetmute Airport
 St. Mary's (KSM) - St. Mary's Airport (Hub)
 St. Michael (SMK) - St. Michael Airport
 Stebbins (WBB) - Stebbins Airport
 Teller (TLA) - Teller Airport
 Toksook Bay (OOK) - Toksook Bay Airport
 Tuluksak (TLT) - Tuluksak Airport
 Tuntutuliak (WTL) - Tuntutuliak Airport
 Tununak (TNK) - Tununak Airport
 Unalakleet (UNK) - Unalakleet Airport (Hub)
 Utqiagvik (BRW) - Wiley Post–Will Rogers Memorial Airport (Hub)
 Wainwright (AIN) - Wainwright Airport
 White Mountain (WMO) - White Mountain Airport

Accidents and incidents
On November 8, 1997 Hageland Aviation Services Flight 500 was performed by a Cessna Caravan 675B that crashed. This crash was determined to be caused primarily by pilot error. Please see the NTSB report- http://juneauempire.com/stories/022500/Loc_crash.html . The accident killed all 8 passengers and crew on board.

On December 9, 2002 - During a Raytheon Pre-purchase Flight, a Beechcraft 1900C crashed after running into a mountain in western Arkansas. The accident killed all 3 pilots on board, including Ron Tweto, President of Hageland Aviation Services.

January 6, 2011 A Cessna 208B Grand Caravan passenger plane, registered N715HE, sustained substantial damage in a landing accident at Kipnuk Airport, AK (KPN), U.S. None of the four passengers or two crew members were injured. The airplane operated on Hageland flight 161 from Bethel Airport, AK (BET) to Kipnuk Airport, AK (KPN).

On November 29, 2013, four people were killed when Flight 1453 crashed near the village of St. Mary's. Killed were the pilot, Terry Hanson, 68, and three passengers, all residents of Mountain Village: Rose Polty, 57, Richard Polty, 65, and Wyatt Coffee, five months old. Six more passengers were injured. The flight originated from Bethel.

References

External links
 

1981 establishments in Alaska
2009 disestablishments in Alaska
Airlines disestablished in 2009
Airlines established in 1981
Airlines based in Alaska
Companies based in Anchorage, Alaska
Defunct companies based in Alaska
Defunct regional airlines of the United States
Kusilvak Census Area, Alaska
Defunct airlines of the United States